Lusitano Ginásio Clube Moncarapachense, also commonly known as Moncarapachense, is a Portuguese sports club based in Moncarapacho, Olhão competing in the Liga 3 for the first season in their history. The club was founded 4 March 1953, influenced by Lusitano Ginásio Clube, from Évora. The club's home ground is the Estádio Dr. António João Eusébio.

References

Football clubs in Portugal